Lieutenant Colonel John Maitland  (1732 – 22 October 1779) was a British Marine and Army officer and politician who sat in the House of Commons between 1774 and 1779.

Maitland was the eighth surviving son of Charles Maitland, 6th Earl of Lauderdale, and his wife Lady Elizabeth Ogilvy, daughter of James Ogilvy, 4th Earl of Findlater. He was a Captain in the Royal Marines in 1757 and served in the Seven Years' War, losing his right arm in action. When peace came in 1763 he went onto half-pay.

In 1768 Maitland stood for Parliament at Haddington Burghs when there was a double return, but decided not to contest the matter. He was appointed Clerk of the Pipe in Scottish Exchequer in 1769. He returned to the active list in 1770 and became a major in 1775. Meanwhile, he was returned at the 1774 general election as Member of Parliament for Haddington Burghs. Little is known of his parliamentary career and from 1777 he was away serving in America.

In May 1778 Maitland was commanding marines against vessels in the Delaware during the American Revolutionary War and became Lieutenant-colonel of the 1st Battalion, 71st Regiment of Foot, Fraser's Highlanders in October 1778. He fought at the Battle of Stono Ferry, where he commanded the British redoubt, and helped lift the siege of Savannah. He died of malaria on 22 October 1779 shortly after the siege was lifted. For over a century, he was interred in a tomb in Savannah's Colonial Park Cemetery, alongside his rival Nathanael Greene. In 1981, Dr. Preston Russell gained permission from the city to enter the tomb. He took Maitland's bones back to his native Scotland.

External links
 New Jersey Postal History Society A Wonderful Revolutionary Letter

References 
Specific

General
 British Peerage (published 1832), p. 213.
 The Siege of Savannah, ed. Franklin Benjamin Hough, 1866
 Highlanders in America, John Patterson MacLean, 1900. pp. 352–358.

1732 births
1779 deaths
Highland Light Infantry officers
British Army personnel of the American Revolutionary War
British MPs 1774–1780
Members of the Parliament of Great Britain for English constituencies
Younger sons of earls
18th-century British Army personnel
18th-century Royal Marines personnel
American Revolutionary War deaths
Deaths from malaria